Mohammed al-Hamad Stadium is a multi-purpose stadium in Hawally, Kuwait.  It is currently used mostly for football matches. The stadium holds 22,000.

The stadium is the home of Al Qadsia Kuwait.

References

Football venues in Kuwait
Multi-purpose stadiums in Kuwait